Mykola Stepanovych Barsamov (5 December 1892, Tbilisi - 10 March 1976, Feodosia) was a Ukrainian Soviet artist and researcher of I.K. Aivazovsky's work.

Biography 
In 1913, he graduated from the Rostov School of Drawing. He studied in the private studio of II Mashkov in Moscow. In 1913–1917, he studied at the Moscow School of Painting, Sculpture and Architecture.

In the late 1910s and early 1920s, he worked as a drawing teacher in the city of Izyum, in Samara, and as a retouching artist in Moscow.

Director of the Feodosia Historical and Archaeological Museum (1923–1936), Feodosia Art Gallery (1923–1962); scientific consultant of the Feodosia Art Gallery. I.K. Aivazovsky (1962–1976). He made a disproportionate contribution to increasing the funds of the art gallery, because the artist I.K. Aivazovsky left 49 of his works in Feodosia, and all of them were painted in the last years of the marine painter's life. Barsamov organized an art studio at the gallery in the 1930s and an art school in 1952.

He was awarded the title of Honored Artist of the USSR (1969). Honorary citizen of Feodosia (1962).

The figure of Barsamov became a link that connected the representatives of the Cimmerian school of painting of two generations: the beginning and the middle of the twentieth century. M.S. Barsamov's students were: S. Mamchich, V.O. Sokolov, P.K. Stolyarenko, M. Ya. Shorin.

Art 
Barsamov created a number of paintings on the heroic history of the Crimea, portraits, landscapes and still lifes. Paintings "The Battleship Potemkin" (1941), "Marines in Feodosia" (1942), "recover port in Feodosia" (1947), "Grapes and peaches" (1959), portraits, landscapes of the Crimea, etc. Tr. about the work of Aivazovsky, including kN. "Ivan Konstantinovich Aivazovsky" (1941).

References 

1892 births
1976 deaths
Artists from Tbilisi
Recipients of the Order of the Red Banner of Labour
Ukrainian artists
Moscow School of Painting, Sculpture and Architecture alumni